Chesebrough Manufacturing Company was an oil business, founded in 1859, which produced petroleum jelly or Vaseline, which was marketed with the brand name Luxor. Robert Augustus Chesebrough, a chemist who started the company, was interested in marketing oil products for medicinal use. He produced the first petroleum jelly by refining so-called rod wax, a paraffin-like substance that formed on oil drilling rigs, using heat and filtration. He named the substance "Vaseline", from the German word for water (Wasser) and the Greek word for oil (olion). Vaseline was patented in the United States in 1872 and England in 1877.

Company history
In 1870, Robert Chesebrough began selling a product derived from petroleum residue, Vaseline Petroleum Jelly. Chesebrough's first manufacturing plant for vaseline was in  Perth Amboy, New Jersey. In 1881, Chesebrough Manufacturing began operating under Standard Oil. With the breakup of Standard Oil in 1911, it regained independence. Additional production sites were built in Pittsburgh, Pennsylvania, and in 1924, London, England.

Chesebrough Manufacturing Company distributed its product throughout the United States and Britain during the early and mid-20th century. Its UK office was at 42 Holborn Viaduct.
It was listed on the New York Stock Exchange and grouped with other oil-related stocks such as Standard Oil and its subsidiaries, and Continental Oil.

The company had a productive record of earnings and dividend disbursements, even after the onset of the Great Depression. Earnings increased from $8.36 per share in 1925 to $13.22 during 1929.
As of December 31, 1940, the Chesebrough Manufacturing Company had total assets of $4,267,940 and liabilities of $603,643.  In 1940, damage to its London plant from a World War II air raid totaled $50,000.

Chesebrough and Pond's merged in June 1955 and, in 1987, Chesebrough-Ponds was acquired by the Anglo-Dutch company Unilever.

References

Chesebrough Manufacturing Company
Cheesebrough Manufacturing Company
Chesebrough Manufacturing Company
Defunct companies based in New Jersey
Unilever companies
1859 establishments in New Jersey
Energy companies established in 1859
Manufacturing companies established in 1859